Zodarion turcicum is a spider species found in Bulgaria and Turkey.

See also 
 List of Zodariidae species

References

External links 

turcicum
Spiders of Europe
Arthropods of Turkey
Spiders described in 1980